{{Speciesbox
| image = Gmelina philippensis-- the Parrot Beak (26137111840).jpg
| image_caption = Flower
| genus = Gmelina
| species = philippensis
| authority = Cham.
| range_map = 
| range_map_caption =
| synonyms = Gmelina asiatica var. philippensis (Cham.) Bakh.Gmelina finlaysoniana Wall. ex Kuntze [Illegitimate]Gmelina finlaysoniana Wall.Gmelina finlaysoniana f. colorata KuntzeGmelina finlaysoniana var. silvestris KuntzeGmelina finlaysoniana f. viridibracteata KuntzeGmelina hystrix Schult. ex KurzGmelina philippensis f. colorata (Kuntze) MoldenkeGmelina philippensis f. viridibracteata (Kuntze) Moldenke
}}Gmelina philippensis'' is a plant species in the family Lamiaceae (but previously placed on the Verbenaceae).  No subspecies are listed in the Catalogue of Life.

Gallery

References

External links 

philippensis
Flora of Indo-China
Flora of Malesia